Jorge Antônio de Oliveira Francisco is a Brazilian lawyer and retired military police officer. He is the current Secretary-General of the Presidency of the Republic. On 20 October 2020, Jorge Oliveira was confirmed by the Federal Senate to the Federal Court of Accounts, succeeding minister José Múcio, who will retire on 31 December.

Biography
Oliveira graduated in high school in the Brasília Military School and reached the rank of Major in the Military Police of the Federal District. He retired and military police in 2013. Bachelor in Law, Oliveira coursed Knowledge and Operations Production in the Brazilian Intelligence Agency (Abin) and worked from 2003 to 2018 in the National Congress.

On 21 June 2019, President Jair Bolsonaro nominated him as Secretary-General of the Presidency of the Republic, replacing retired Divisional General Floriano Peixoto Vieira Neto, who was transferred to the presidency of the Brazilian Company of Post Offices and Telegraphs.

References

|-

1974 births
Living people
Politicians from Rio de Janeiro (city)
21st-century Brazilian lawyers
Brazilian military personnel
Government ministers of Brazil